The Jack Creek Bathhouse is a historic recreational facility in Ouachita National Forest, Logan County, Arkansas.  It is located south of Booneville, at the Jack Creek Recreation Area in the northern part of the national forest.  It is a single-story masonry structure, built out of rustic stone, with a gabled roof supported by logs.  It has two dressing rooms, separated by an open breezeway.  It was built in 1936 by a crew of the Civilian Conservation Corps, and is a well-preserved example of the Rustic architecture the CCC is well known for producing.

The building was listed on the National Register of Historic Places in 1993.

See also
National Register of Historic Places listings in Logan County, Arkansas

References

Public baths on the National Register of Historic Places in Arkansas
National Register of Historic Places in Logan County, Arkansas
Buildings and structures completed in 1936
Buildings and structures in Logan County, Arkansas
Ouachita National Forest
Civilian Conservation Corps in Arkansas
1936 establishments in Arkansas